The canton of Bourg-en-Bresse-Sud  is a former administrative division in eastern France. It comprised part of the commune of Bourg-en-Bresse. It was disbanded following the French canton reorganisation which came into effect in March 2015. It had 15,302 inhabitants (2012).

Demographics

See also
Cantons of the Ain department 
Communes of France

References

Former cantons of Ain
2015 disestablishments in France
States and territories disestablished in 2015